Rayṭa bint Abī Ṭālib, was a companion and first cousin of the Islamic prophet Muhammad.

Family
She was the youngest daughter of Abu Talib ibn Abd al-Muttalib and Fatimah bint Asad. She was also known as "Asmā’", and she was probably the same daughter known as "Umm Ṭālib", indicating that she had a son named Talib.

History
In 628 CE, Muhammad assigned Umm Talib an income of 40  from Khaybar.

References

Women companions of the Prophet